Gajarajan Guruvayur Keshavan (1912—2 December 1976) is perhaps the most famous and celebrated temple elephant in Kerala, India. Keshavan was donated to the Guruvayur temple by the royal family of Nilambur on 4 January 1922 . 

Standing over 3.2.8 meters tall, he was one of the tallest elephants that lived in Kerala and was known for his devout behavior. As Keshavan's name and fame increased, the Devaswom board gave him the unique title Gajarajan (King of elephants) in 1973. Keshavan died on 2 December 1976, which happened to be Guruvayur Ekadasi, considered a very auspicious day. The anniversary of his death is still mourned in Guruvayur. Many elephants line up before the statue and the chief elephant garlands it. After his death, Guruvayur Padmanabhan became the successor of Guruvayur Keshavan.

Life
Guruvayur Keshavan was captured from Nilambur forest and taken to the famous Nilambur Royal family as their 12th elephant. According to Guruvayur lore, Valiya Raja of Nilambur once prayed to the Lord to save his family and property from the enemies attack. He promised to offer one of his many elephants if his wish is fulfilled. When his wish was fulfilled, he offered Keshavan to the temple on 4 January 1922. Many people says that Keshavan bend his front-legs only before those who hold Lord’s Thidambu to enable them to climb upon him and all others were to climb by his behind-legs. He is said to have never caused any bodily harm to anyone and had the ability to lift his head a much height as possible for hours while carrying Thidambu.  Keshavan was also famous for winning in many Guruvayur Aanyottam (elephant race). Legend says that , Keshavan defeated Akhori Govindan, a famous elephant from outside of Guruvayur in the 1930's Aanayottam. In 1973, Keshavan became the first elephant to get honoured with the unique title "Gajarajan" (Elephant King), by the Guruvayur Devaswom. During the Guruvayur Ekadasi of 1976, Keshavan fell ill and was about to tremble during the deity procession. He was immediately taken to the stable where he fasted for the night and died few days later on 2 December 1976. He fasted for the entire day and dropped down facing the direction of the temple with his trunk raised as a mark of prostration. His death anniversary is still celebrated on the evening of every year's Ekadasi by the elephants of Guruvayur Devaswom lining up before Keshavan's statue and the chief elephant garlanding it, thus paying tribute.

Legacy
The Guruvayur Devaswom erected a life-size statue of Keshavan in its precincts as tribute to the services he rendered to the presiding deity of the temple. His tusks, along with a majestic portrait of the elephant, can be still seen adorning the entrance to the main temple enclosure. Its life is the subject of the 1977 Malayalam feature film Guruvayur Kesavan, released the year after his death. The film was directed by Bharathan, starring M. G. Soman, Adoor Bhasi, Sankaradi, Bahadoor, Jayabharathi, Vennira Aadai Nirmala (Ushakumari), Veeran, Oduvil Unnikrishnan, Junior Sheela, M S Nambudiri, N Govindankutty, Paravoor Bharathan and Manavalan Joseph. Nayarambalam Shivaji was in the lead role as Guruvayur Kesavan. The cinematography of the film was done by Ashok Kumar. The story of Guruvayur Keshavan is portrayed in a television serial on Surya TV (2009—2010), scripted by Pradeep Sivasankar, starring Captain Raju, KPAC Sajeev, Kaviyoor Ponnamma, Salu Menon and Kollam Ajith.

See also
 Cultural depictions of elephants
 Elephants in Kerala culture
 Guruvayur Temple
 List of individual elephants

References

External links

Guruvayoor Devaswom webpage 

1904 animal births
1976 animal deaths
Individual elephants
Elephants in Indian culture
Individual animals in India
Guruvayur
Elephants in Hinduism
Elephants in Kerala